Nucras ornata, the ornate sandveld lizard or ornate scrub lizard, is a wall lizard in the family of true lizards (Lacertidae). It is found in Tanzania, Malawi, Zambia, south to KwaZulu-Natal, west to the Cape Province, Botswana, and Namibia.

References 

Nucras
Lacertid lizards of Africa
Reptiles described in 1864
Taxa named by John Edward Gray